Cave Noire (カーブノア) is a roguelike video game developed and published by Konami and released on April 19, 1991, for Game Boy.

Gameplay
The game revolves around four quests: killing monsters, freeing fairies, or collecting gold/orbs with ten difficulties each. The difficulty determines how big the target number is, the stats the player starts with, and what monsters are encountered. Starting a quest creates a randomly generated dungeon where the player has one chance to reach the goal – death means a new dungeon has to be created. Beating a difficulty level unlocks the next; this is also the one thing the game saves.

The dungeon itself is shown from a top-down perspective and features the hero, walls, floor tiles, monsters, and items to collect. Movement is turn-based and each turn is divided into four phases (player movement, player attack, monster attack, and finally monster movement). Attacks are only possible when the two participants stand in adjacent tiles; the computer simply calculates the result from the participants' statistics (attack, defence, luck, and a random component) which then lowers the health points of the attacked hero/monster. Of course, reaching a health of zero means defeat. The mentioned statistics can be improved by finding and using certain items like weapons or armour. Potions, spells, and rings have additional effects when used/equipped, e.g. health refreshments, poison, dealing increased damage, or invisibility.

The environment also plays a part in the quest. The walls and tiles may have special effects when touched, as with pits (the player/monster falls to the next level of the dungeon and takes damage), breakable walls, lava, or teleporters. Some rooms may be covered in fog which obscures the floor tiles until the hero walks onto them (monsters are still visible). There is a specific kind of monster which clears the whole room when killed – but at the same time, another one has the exact opposite effect.

References

External links
 at Konami's Game Boy software list (Japanese) on Wayback Machine

1991 video games
Action video games
Game Boy games
Game Boy-only games
Japan-exclusive video games
Konami franchises
Maze games
Roguelike video games
Single-player video games
Video games developed in Japan